"Toys for Boys" was the third single by Marion, released in May 1995. It reached number 57 on the UK Singles Chart.

Track listing
All tracks by Harding/Grantham/Cunningham, words by Harding.

7" vinyl and CC
 "Toys For Boys"
 "Down The Middle With You"

CD
 "Toys For Boys"
 "Down The Middle With You"
 "Changed For The Same"

Personnel
 Jaime Harding - vocals, harmonica
 Tony Grantham - guitar
 Phil Cunningham - guitar
 Julian Phillips - bass
 Murad Mousa - drums

References

Marion (band) songs
1995 singles
1995 songs
Songs written by Phil Cunningham (rock musician)
London Records singles
Songs written by Jaime Harding